Murrawee is a locality located in the Rural City of Swan Hill, Victoria, Australia. Murrawee post office opened on 8 December 1921 and was closed on 14 May 1947.

References

Towns in Victoria (Australia)
Rural City of Swan Hill